Jole Richard Hughes (born 17 December 1981), better known by his stage name S3RL (pronounced "Serl"), is an Australian hardcore DJ, record producer, singer and musician from Brisbane.

Career
S3RL is a UK hardcore musician from Brisbane who performs as "S3RL" (or "DJ S3RL"). The stage name "S3RL" was based on a nickname his cousins gave him when he was little, which derived from his cousins calling him "arsehole". To avoid profanity, they began saying "arserl", and according to S3RL, the word stuck and became his stage name.

One of S3RL's most popular tracks is "Pretty Rave Girl" (2006), which uses the melody from "Daddy DJ" (November 1999) by the French dance act of the same name. S3RL has contributed tracks for several UK hardcore compilation series, including the Bonkers series. Some of his other works are "Fantasy Land", "Raver Dimension", "Rainbow Girl", "Friendzoned", "Sek C Raver", "Little Kandi Raver", "Pika Girl", "Keep on Raving Baby", "the Bass and the Melody", "Dopamine", "You Are Mine", "Wont Let You Go", "Bass Slut", "Feel the Melody", "All That I Need" and "MTC" (also known as "Masturbate To Cartoons").

In October 2010, he appeared as a DJ at the inaugural Bam! Festival at Ivory's Rock in southeast Queensland.

Many of his songs reference different aspects of Japanese pop culture, such as anime, manga, hentai, and video games. In 2011, he founded his own record label, EMFA Music, through which all of his works are released. In May 2012, the label released "Press Play Walk Away" as a single by S3RL and SynthWulf, a fellow hardcore DJ.

As of February 2015, S3RL was ranked 1798 on the "Official Global DJ Rankings" page djrankings.org, which bases its rankings on a number of factors include chart rankings, DJ fees and radio airplay. During mid-2015, his single "Genre Police" (featuring Lexi), which had been issued in Australia in November the previous year, peaked at #10 on the Norwegian singles chart.

In January 2017, S3RL was announced as a featured artist for the rhythm game, Osu!.

In early 2018, S3RL announced that his 2018 tour would be his last, citing a desire to spend more time with his family. Though he advertised it as being his final shows, he clarified that he might be willing to return to the stage after at least two years: "After 2018 I will not do any shows for at least a couple of years, then re-assess the situation to do the occasional show here and there.... For example, if I was booked for a show in 2020 that I could bring my family along to I would consider it, but during the two years off I will not be doing any shows at home or away." He also stated that his music production would be unaffected.

In February 2020, S3RL decides to hire contract partners to help him make his new music videos.  He notably recruits Aurélien Dacher, a French beatmaker, and they have since created: You Are Mine, Nasty, Dopamine, Wanna Fight Huh, The Bass & The Melody, and S3RL Absolutely Presents.

In May 2021, S3RL announced his new label, M4 Music, with the release of "Dance More (Atef Remix)" on 14 May 2021.

Personal life
S3RL lives in Brisbane, Queensland with his wife Jodie and their two sons.

Discography

Singles

S3RL Remix tracks

S3RL Mixes

See also 

 List of people from Brisbane
 List of record producers
 List of turntablists
 Music of Brisbane

References

External links
 
 
  on Myspace
 
 S3RL on Spotify

1981 births
20th-century Australian musicians
21st-century Australian musicians
Australian dance musicians
Australian DJs
Australian record producers
Happy hardcore musicians
Hardcore techno musicians
Living people
Media founders
People from Brisbane
Electronic dance music DJs